2 Different Tears is an extended play by South Korean girl group the Wonder Girls. The title track was written and produced by J.Y. Park. It was simultaneously released internationally on May 15, 2010, in English, Korean and Chinese. It was the first release to member Hyelim who replaced former member, Sunmi, after she departed from the group in February 2010. The EP also contained a 2009 English version of their number one single "Nobody".

Background and release

"2 Different Tears" continues the retro theme of the Wonder Girls, including the 1980s inspired "Tell Me" and the 1960s, Motown-inspired "Nobody", by using a disco theme. The concept was created by Sohee and Yubin who describe it as a "more sophisticated and mature, modern feel." The music uses melodies similar to the Hustle. The lyrics speak about remembering a lost love.

Stylistically, the Wonder Girls used a retro 1980s denim look to promote the song as shown on the single cover and in the accompanying music video. The single release also included the English versions of previous singles "So Hot and "Tell Me" and as well as remixes of the title track and "Nobody". After the singles' release in Korea, the Wonder Girls embarked on their North American tour.

EP was released in United States for digital download via iTunes Store on May 15, 2010. Following day, it was released digitally worldwide and physically in South Korea. In June 2010, it was released physically in China and in August 2010 in Philippines through MCA Music and Universal Music Group. It was promoted with Wonder Girls World Tour.

Music video
The music video was directed by Jang Jae-hyeok, who had previously collaborated with the group on videos "Irony", "So Hot", and "Nobody". The video was filmed in Korean, English, and Chinese, and features cameo appearances by comedian, podcast host, and actor Bobby Lee and music producer Park Jin-young. The video parodies the classic American television series Charlie's Angels. The group members wear 1980s inspired clothing, make-up and hairstyles.

Commercial performance
The single debuted on South Korea's Gaon Single Chart at number one for the week ending May 22, 2010. "2 Different Tears" stayed at the top of the chart for three consecutive weeks until it was replaced by IU and Seulong's "Nagging" on June 6, 2010. By the end of 2010, the single had sold 2,790,298 digital copies and 28,594 physical copies, becoming the sixth best-seller of the year in the country.

In the United States, the single failed to chart on the Billboard Hot 100 however the album placed at number 21 on the Heatseekers Albums chart on July 7, 2010. In Canada, "2 Different Tears" debuted at number 6 on the Canadian Singles Chart on May 20, 2010.

Music program awards

Track listing
All tracks are in English unless otherwise specified.

Charts

Weekly charts

Album charts

Year-end charts

Release history

References

External links
 

Wonder Girls albums
JYP Entertainment EPs
2010 EPs
Gaon Digital Chart number-one singles